Patriarch Theodore I may refer to:

 Theodore I of Constantinople, Ecumenical Patriarch in 677–679
 Patriarch Theodore I of Alexandria, Greek Patriarch of Alexandria (607–609)